Kristin Thompson (born 1950) is an American film theorist and author whose research interests include the close formal analysis of films, the history of film styles, and "quality television," a genre akin to art film. She wrote two scholarly books in the 1980s which used an analytical technique called neoformalism. As well, she has co-authored two widely used film studies textbooks with her husband David Bordwell.

Career

1970s and 1980s
Thompson earned her master's degree in film studies at the University of Iowa (1973) and a Ph.D. in film studies at the University of Wisconsin–Madison. She has held teaching positions at the University of Wisconsin, the University of Iowa, Indiana University, the University of Amsterdam, and the University of Stockholm.

She co-wrote the film textbook, Film Art: An Introduction, with husband David Bordwell. Film Art, with a tenth edition published in 2013, was originally published in 1979 and has become a standard in the field of film aesthetics. To date, it has been translated into seven languages.

Thompson predominantly relies on an analytical method drawn from Russian Formalism known as neoformalism. This method formed the basis for her dissertation, which subsequently became her first scholarly book, Eisenstein's "Ivan the Terrible": A Neoformalist Analysis. Neoformalism is also the basis for her later book, Breaking the Glass Armor.

1990s and 2000s
In 1994, she co-wrote another textbook with Bordwell, Film History. In early 2001 she did a series of lectures at Oxford University. She holds an honorary fellowship in the Department of Communication Arts at the University of Wisconsin–Madison.

Quality television
Thompson argues that a small number of television shows stand out as quality television shows, due to their use of "...a quality pedigree, a large ensemble cast, a series memory, creation of a new genre through recombination of older ones, self-consciousness, and pronounced tendencies toward the controversial and the realistic." She claims that television shows such as Twin Peaks,  Buffy the Vampire Slayer, The Sopranos, and The Simpsons exhibit traits also found in art films, such as psychological realism, narrative complexity, and ambiguous plotlines.

She notes that David Lynch's  Twin Peaks television series have "...a loosening of causality, a greater emphasis on psychological or anecdotal realism, violations of classical clarity of space and time, explicit authorial comment, and ambiguity." She compares Lynch's film Blue Velvet and the television series Twin Peaks and asks "...whether there can be an "art television" comparable to the more familiar "art cinema."

As well, she points out that series such as  Buffy the Vampire Slayer, The Sopranos, and The Simpsons "...have altered longstanding notions of closure and single authorship", which means that "...television has wrought its own changes in traditional narrative form." She states that The Simpsons uses a "...flurry of cultural references, intentionally inconsistent characterization, and considerable self-reflexivity about television conventions and the status of the program as a television show."

Lord of the Rings
In the mid-2000s, Thompson's interest in Hollywood norms led her to write a monograph about the popular fantasy trilogy The Lord of the Rings: The Frodo Franchise: The Lord of the Rings and Modern Hollywood. According to Thompson, the book "[...] examine[s] the larger phenomenon of this hugely successful franchise, examining the film's making but also its marketing via the Internet, its merchandising (particularly DVDs and video games), and its impact on world cinema." It is based on the author's interviews with many of the artists, writers, and business people who participated in the making of The Lord of the Rings motion pictures.

Select bibliography

See also
 Quality television

References

External links

American women historians
Film theorists
Television studies
1950 births
Living people
American film historians
University of Iowa alumni
University of Wisconsin–Madison School of Journalism & Mass Communication alumni
American textbook writers
Women textbook writers
20th-century American women writers
20th-century American historians
21st-century American women writers
21st-century American historians